Lasse Pirjetä (born April 4, 1974) is a Finnish former professional ice hockey forward. He represented several teams in the Finnish SM-liiga, Frölunda HC in the Swedish Elitserien and the Columbus Blue Jackets and Pittsburgh Penguins in the NHL.

Playing career
Pirjetä spent the majority of his first nine years of his professional career playing in his native Finnish league the SM-Liiga. After nominating, Pirjetä was selected by the Columbus Blue Jackets as their fifth-round pick, 133rd overall, in the 2002 NHL Entry Draft, as an overage draftee. Pirjetä made the jump to the NHL immediately in 2002–03 season with the Blue Jackets, appearing in 51 games with a solid 21 points. In the following 2003–04 season, Pirjetä struggled to maintain his form from his debut season and was traded by the Blue Jackets, to the Pittsburgh Penguins, for Brian Holzinger on March 10, 2004.

After starting the 2005–06 season with Pittsburgh, he was sent down to the Penguins' AHL team, the Wilkes-Barre/Scranton Penguins on December 15, 2005. After playing only 8 games with Wilkes-Barre on January 20, Pirjetä returned to Europe to play for the Kloten Flyers in the Swiss NLA.

Career statistics

Regular season and playoffs

International

References

External links
 

1974 births
Living people
Columbus Blue Jackets draft picks
Columbus Blue Jackets players
Finnish ice hockey centres
Frölunda HC players
HIFK (ice hockey) players
EHC Kloten players
Oulun Kärpät players
Malmö Redhawks players
Pittsburgh Penguins players
Sportspeople from Oulu
Syracuse Crunch players
Tacoma Rockets players
Tappara players
HC TPS players
Wilkes-Barre/Scranton Penguins players